Kann is a Jewish and Austrian family name, and may refer to

 KANN, a radio station broadcasting
 Caro-Kann (- Defense), named after Marcus Kann
 Netrikkan, a 1981 Tamil film
 Omslag: Martin Kann, an album by the Swedish band bob hund
 S. Kann Sons Co., a department store in Washington, D.C.

People 
 Alphonse Kann (1870–1948), French art collector of Jewish heritage
 D.W. Kann, film maker
Edith Kann (1907–1987), Austrian botanist and phycologist
 Hans Kann (1927–2005), Austrian Jewish pianist, composer
 Kraig Kann (born 1966), US personality on The Golf Channel
 Moses Kann (died 1762), German rabbi
 Peter R. Kann (born 1942), US journalist, editor, and businessman
 Stan Kann (1924–2008), collector of vacuum cleaners

See also 
 Cann (disambiguation)
 Kahn
 Cahn
 Kan (disambiguation)
 Can (disambiguation)

Jewish surnames
Kohenitic surnames
Yiddish-language surnames